Abdi Mohamed Ahmed (born 30 December 1962), popularly nicknamed AbdiXaaq , is a Somali former footballer who played as a goalkeeper. He spent his whole career at Kismaayo F.C in Somalia from 1978–88. He is one of the most successful Somali footballers of all time, having won 4 Somali championships, 6 Somali Cup Titles. His individual contributions have earned him five consecutive Best Goalkeeper Of Regions Of Somalia awards & captained his club on numerous occasions. Abdi is nicknamed AbdiXaaq due to his formidable presence and influence. Abdi was also known for his skills as a dead-ball specialist, and often took penalties. He was also known for his eccentricity and at times fiery temper, which brought him his fair share of controversies; Abdi Mohamed made his last professional appearance for Kismaayo in 1988 at the National Stadium of Mogadishu by helping his team win the league title by saving a penalty and amazingly scoring the decisive penalty himself. He is considered to be one of the greatest goalkeepers in the History of Somali Football having also featured in the Somali National team (16 Regions) squad for 9 years.

Personal life
Abdi Mohamed currently lives in Australia with his family. Abdi wishes to begin football development projects and open a football club in the near future. Abdi is also an active football ambassador of his homeland.

Honours

Kismaayo F.C
 Somali League Championships: 1981, 1982, 1985, 1986
 League Cup: 1980, 1981, 1983, 1984, 1986, 1987

Individual
 Somali Footballer of the Year: 1980, 1982
 Best Somali Regions Goalkeeper: 1981, 1982, 1984, 1985, 1986

External links
  allkisima.com
  somalitalk.com
  somaliaonline.com
  somaliweek.com

Somalian footballers
1962 births
Living people
Somalia international footballers
Association football goalkeepers